Mohammed Dawood Khatri is a Master craftsman born on  in Bagh, Madhya Pradesh, India. He is Bagh Print Craftsman.

Awards
National Award in 2012State Award in 2011National Merit Award 2007

References

1974 births
Living people
Indian artisans
People from Dhar district